Bryan Avila also known as The Producer BDB was born in Riverside California, he currently lives and works out the city of Los Angeles.

He is an emergent contemporary artist who has lived all over the world. His work is born out of street art with hints of fashion, pop culture, music, technology and history.

In his artworks one can find characters such as Frida Kahlo, Andy Warhol, Karl Lagerfeld, Anna Wintour, Hillary Clinton, John Lennon and countless others. He often collaborates with other artist such as Flore (Artist), Chris Brown and Karen Bystedt.

His mural work can be found globally in cities such as Paris, Madrid, Rio de Janeiro, Miami, Berlin, Tokyo, Singapore, Hong Kong, Seoul, and Los Angeles.

Artistic career
The early stages of his career where marked by a series of mural works. He traveled around the globe and created murals on the cities of Paris, Madrid, Rio de Janeiro, Miami, Berlin and Los Angeles. After dabbling into fashion and design, he realized that his true passion lies in fine art. Thus he began to blend his interest into fine art representation.

His artwork is heavily influenced by pop culture, fashion, music, art, history and technology.

Selected exhibitions
 May 2017, The Art of Rock & Graffiti, Bunkamura Gallery, Tokyo, Japan
 April 2017, Who's Next? Banksy Vs. Next Generation, Gallery 21| Odaiba, Japan
 February 2017, TommyLand, Tommy Hilfiger Fashion Show, Venice Beach, California
 December 2016, 2016 Art Basel Miami, Oliver Cole Gallery, Miami, Florida
 June 2016, 2016 World Graffiti Arts, Gallery 21, Tokyo, Japan
 June 2016, Plastic Jesus & The Producer BDB, Bruce Lurie, Los Angeles, California
 May 2016, The Producer BDB at Maui, Mouche Contemporary, Wailea, Maui
 December 2015, Port of Angels, CVC Project Space, Miami, Florida
 November 2015, Noche de Altares, Marcas Contemporary, Santa Ana, California
 October 2015, Flore & The Producer BDB Have Landed at Mouche, Mouche Contemporary, Los Angeles, California
 October 2015, BotArt International, West Edge Design, Santa Monica, California
 September 2015, Delta Sky Lounge BDB, LAX Airport, Los Angeles, California
 July 2015, In-tl-ekts x BDB, INTLCTS, Pomona, California
 April 2015, The Producer BDB & Moncho 1929, Bruce Lurie, Culver City, California
 March 2015, Open Gallery Launch, Gallery 38, West Adams, California
 November 2014, Lost Warhols, Bruce Lurie, Culver City, California
 November 2014, El Velorio, BoatHouse Gallery, Plaza de la Raza, Los Angeles, California

Art fairs
 May 2017, Tokyo International Art Fair, Tokyo, Japan
 April 2017, Art Market San Francisco, San Francisco, California
 April 2017, Affordable Art Fair Singapore| Singapore, Singapore
 March 2017, Art Boca Raton, Boca Raton, Florida
 February 2017, Art Wynwood, Wynwood, Florida
 February 2017, Art Palm Springs, Palm Springs, California
 January 2017, Art Palm Beach, West Palm Beach, Florida
 January 2017, LA Art Show, Los, Angeles, California
 December 2016, Scope Miami Beach| Miami Beach, Florida
 December 2016, RedDot Miami| Miami, Florida
 November 2016, New York Art, Antiques and Jewelry Show, New York, New York
 September 2016, Affordable Art Fair, New York, New York
 September 2016, Houston Art Fair, Houston, Texas
 August 2016, Art Aspen, Aspen, Colorado
 June 2016, Art Hamptons, Bridgehampton, New York
 April 2016, Affordable Art Fair, New York, New York
 March 2016, Scope NYC, New York, New York
 February 2016, Palm Springs Fine Art Fair, Palm Springs, California
 January 2016, LA Art Show, Los Angeles, California
 December 2015, RedDot Miami| Miami, Florida
 April 2015, Love Art Toronto, New York, New York
 March 2015, Art Boca Raton, Miami, Florida
 October 2015, Street Art Fair, Los Angeles, California
 September 2015, Affordable Art Fair , New York, New York
 September 2015, Houston Fine Art Fair, Houston, Texas
 August 2015, Art Aspen, Aspen, Colorado
 July 2015, Art Hamptons, Bridgehampton, New York
 March 2015, Affordable Art Fair, New York, New York

Film and video
 Artumentary - The Producer BDB. Prod. Equator Productions. Perf. The Producer BDB. Equator Productions, 2015. Web Video.

Articles and press
 The Producer BDB in WWD Japan
 The Producer BDB in Artnet
 The Producer BDB in Huffington Post 
 The Producer BDB in Art Above Reality 
 The Producer BDB in Bancs Media
 The Producer BDB in Artsy Magazine
 The Producer BDB in Stylabl

References

External links
 The Producer BDB's Website
 The Producer BDB at CuratorLove
 The Producer BDB at Bruce Lurie Gallery
 The Producer BDB at Mouche Gallery
 The Producer BDB at Zebra One Gallery

Books and references
 Hirugami, Erika. "The Birth of a Global Empire" Published by CuratorLove. June 2016.

Street artists
American graffiti artists
American contemporary artists
American pop artists
Living people
1983 births